Aicha Mezemate (born June 6, 1991) is an Algerian volleyball player, playing as middle-blocker. She has played for the Algeria women's national volleyball team.

Clubs

 Current club:  Amiens vb
 Debut:  NC Bejaia

References

1991 births
Living people
Algerian women's volleyball players
Volleyball players from Béjaïa
Middle blockers
Algerian expatriates in France
Expatriate volleyball players in France
21st-century Algerian people
Mediterranean Games competitors for Algeria
Competitors at the 2022 Mediterranean Games